Delvin Antonio Rodríguez (born May 4, 1980) is a Dominican professional boxer who has challenged three times for a world title (once at welterweight and twice at light middleweight).

Professional career

Welterweight
Delvin defeated Shamone Alvarez in a title eliminator bout on ESPN's Friday Night Fights at the Mohegan Sun Casino in Connecticut. The official score cards of the judges had it 115 to 112 and two other judges had the same score card at 114 to 113 all to Rodriguez.

Rodríguez vs. Hlatshwayo
In 2008, he fought to a draw with Isaac Hlatshwayo in Gauteng, South Africa. It was obvious that Rodriguez was the much busier boxer as he would throw beautiful 3 and 4 punch combinations from the outside. In the middle rounds that fight had become a classic boxer vs. brawler with Isaac taking control. In the 9th round, just as both the round and the fight seemed to going Issac's way in a slight manner, Rodriguez landed a perfected right that sent Hlatshwayo down and make the fight become even more closely contested. Isaac was rewarded a split decision victory over Rodriguez. Upon further review of the scorecard however, it was revealed there was a mistake made in calculating on one of the judges scoring. As a result, the fight was changed to its correct decision, a majority decision.

In 2009, Rodriguez again had the "home advantage" when they met in a rematch for the vacant IBF welterweight title at the Mohegan Sun in Connecticut, nine months after their first meeting. Rodriguez fought well, but Isaac dug that bit deeper to win their IBF title fight on a split but well-earned decision.

Rodriguez  went on to lose his next fight, to Rafal Jackiewicz in an IBF title eliminator. It was a close fight in Jackiewicz's home country of Poland, and Rodriguez lost a tight decision.

Rodriguez bounced back with a lopsided decision against a faded Mike Arnaoutis in March 2010 before losing a majority decision to Ashley Theophane in July 2010.

Light middleweight

Rodríguez vs. Wolak
Rodriguez,  who moved up to 154 pounds, battled to a 10-round draw in an exhilarating slugfest at New York's Roseland Ballroom on July 15, 2011, in one of the all-time great battles in the history of ESPN2's "Friday Night Fights" with Pawel Wolak. By the seventh round, Wolak's right eye was grotesquely swollen and virtually closed, but he refused to quit and continued marching forward. They put on what might as well have been a new Arturo Gatti vs. Micky Ward fight, going to a majority draw. The fight was selected as SI.com's 2011 Fight of the Year.

In the rematch, Rodriguez won a unanimous decision over Wolak on the HBO Pay Per View televised undercard of Miguel Cotto vs. Antonio Margarito on December 3, 2011.

Rodríguez vs. Cotto
Rodriguez faced Miguel Cotto on October 5, 2013, at the Amway Center in Orlando, Florida. Cotto displayed an aggressive style early in the fight and landed powerful body shots. In the beginning of the third round, Cotto landed a left hook to the temple which knocked Rodriguez onto the canvas. The referee then stopped the fight and gave Cotto a third-round TKO victory.

Rodríguez vs. Lara
Rodríguez was then scheduled to face Cuban southpaw Erislandy Lara in the main event of a Premier Boxing Champions fight card, after coming off of a draw in his last outing against Joachim Alcine over a year earlier on May 16, 2014. He was dominated throughout the bout by Lara, getting knocked down in the sixth round en route to losing via unanimous decision, which was virtually a shutout.

Professional boxing record

|- style="margin:0.5em auto; font-size:95%;"
|align="center" colspan=8|29 Wins (14 Knockouts), 9 Losses (2 Knockouts), 4 Draws, 0 No Contests
|- style="margin:0.5em auto; font-size:95%;"
|align=center style="border-style: none none solid solid; background: #e3e3e3"|Res.
|align=center style="border-style: none none solid solid; background: #e3e3e3"|Record
|align=center style="border-style: none none solid solid; background: #e3e3e3"|Opponent
|align=center style="border-style: none none solid solid; background: #e3e3e3"|Type
|align=center style="border-style: none none solid solid; background: #e3e3e3"|Rd., Time
|align=center style="border-style: none none solid solid; background: #e3e3e3"|Date
|align=center style="border-style: none none solid solid; background: #e3e3e3"|Location
|align=center style="border-style: none none solid solid; background: #e3e3e3"|Notes
|- align=center
|Loss
|29-9-4
|align=left| Courtney Pennington
|
|
|
|align=left| 
|align=left|
|- align=center
|Win
|29-8-4
|align=left| Shawn Cameron
|
|
|
|align=left| 
|align=left|
|- align=center
|Loss
|28-8-4
|align=left| Erislandy Lara
|
|
|
|align=left| 
|align=left|
|- align=center
|style="background:#abcdef;"|Draw||28-7-4||align=left| Joachim Alcine
|||||
|align=left|
|align=left|
|- align=center
|Loss||28-7-3||align=left| Miguel Cotto
|||||
|align=left| 
|align=left|
|- align=center
|Win ||28-6-3||align=left| Freddy Hernández
||| ||||align=left|
|align=left|
|-align=center
|Win  ||27-6-3  || align=left| George Tahdooahnippah
|||  ||  ||align=left|
|align=left|
|-align=center
|Loss  ||26-6-3  || align=left| Austin Trout
|||   ||  ||align=left|
|align=left|
|-align=center
|Win  ||26-5-3  || align=left| Pawel Wolak
|||   ||  ||align=left|
|align=left|
|-align=center
|style="background: #B0C4DE"|Draw || 25-5-3  ||align=left| Pawel Wolak
| ||  ||  ||align=left|
|align=left|
|-align=center
|Loss || 25-5-2 ||align=left| Ashley Theophane
| ||  ||  ||align=left|
|align=left|
|-align=center
|Win  || 25-4-2  ||align=left| Mike Arnaoutis
| ||  ||  ||align=left|
|align=left|
|-align=center
|Loss || 24-4-2 ||align=left| Rafal Jackiewicz
| ||  ||  ||align=left|
|align=left|
|-align=center
|Loss || 24-3-2 ||align=left| Isaac Hlatshwayo
| ||  ||  ||align=left|
|align=left|
|-align=center
|style="background: #B0C4DE"|Draw || 24-2-2 ||align=left| Isaac Hlatshwayo
| ||  ||  ||align=left|
|align=left|
|-align=center
|Win  || 24-2-1 ||align=left| Oscar Díaz
| || ||  ||align=left|
|align=left|
|-align=center
|Win  || 23-2-1 ||align=left| Troy Browning
| || ||  ||align=left|
|align=left|
|-align=center
|Win  || 22-2-1 ||align=left| Keenan Collins
| || ||  ||align=left|
|align=left|
|-align=center
|Loss || 21-2-1 ||align=left| Jesse Feliciano
| ||  ||  ||align=left|
|align=left|
|-align=center
|Win  || 21-1-1 ||align=left| Frans Hantindi
| || ||  ||align=left|
|align=left|
|-align=center
|Win  || 20-1-1 ||align=left| Luis Hernandez
| || ||  ||align=left|
|align=left|
|-align=center
|Win  || 19-1-1 ||align=left| Alexis 
| || ||  ||align=left|
|align=left|
|-align=center
|Win  || 18-1-1 ||align=left| Virgil McClendon
| || ||  ||align=left|
|align=left|
|-align=center
|Win  || 17-1-1 ||align=left| Luther Smith
| || ||  ||align=left|
|align=left|
|-align=center

Titles in boxing
USBA welterweight champion (2006, 2008)
IBA Intercontinental light middleweight champion (2011)
IBF North American light middleweight champion (2013)

References

External links

1980 births
Living people
Light-middleweight boxers
Welterweight boxers
Dominican Republic male boxers
Sportspeople from Danbury, Connecticut
Boxers from Connecticut
Dominican Republic emigrants to the United States